Onarga Township is one of twenty-six townships in Iroquois County, Illinois, United States.  As of the 2010 census, its population was 1,683 and it contained 647 housing units.

Geography

Cities, towns, villages
 Onarga

Unincorporated towns
 Delrey at 
(This list is based on USGS data and may include former settlements.)

Cemeteries
The township contains Onarga Cemetery.

Major highways
  Interstate 57
  U.S. Route 45
  Illinois Route 54

Demographics

School districts
 Crescent Iroquois Community Unit School District 249
 Iroquois West Community Unit School District 10

Political districts
 Illinois' 15th congressional district
 State House District 105
 State Senate District 53

References
 
 United States Census Bureau 2007 TIGER/Line Shapefiles
 United States National Atlas

External links
 City-Data.com
 Illinois State Archives

Townships in Iroquois County, Illinois
Townships in Illinois